Fyllingsdalen Church is a parish church of the Church of Norway in Bergen Municipality in Vestland county, Norway. It is located in the Fyllingsdalen borough of the city of Bergen. It is the church for the Fyllingsdalen parish which is part of the Bergensdalen prosti (deanery) in the Diocese of Bjørgvin. The white, concrete church was built in a fan-shaped design in 1976 using plans drawn up by the architect Helge Hjertholm. The church seats about 350 people, but it expandable up to about 600.

History

In 1966, the new Fyllingsdalen parish was established. A rented interim church space was in use right away. Planning for a church for the parish began soon afterwards. In 1968, Helge Hjertholm was hired to design the new church (he had designed other nearby churches as well). He designed a modern-looking church with a unique curved roofline. Construction on the church took place from 1974-1976. The new building was consecrated on 3 December 1976.

See also
List of churches in Bjørgvin
Informationen zur Jehmlich Orgel in der Kirche von Fyllingsdalen

References

Churches in Bergen
Fan-shaped churches in Norway
Concrete churches in Norway
20th-century Church of Norway church buildings
Churches completed in 1976
1976 establishments in Norway